Miscera mesochrysa is a moth in the family Brachodidae. It was described by Oswald Bertram Lower in 1903. It is found in Australia.

References

Brachodidae
Moths described in 1903